Josser on the River is a 1932 British comedy film directed by Norman Lee and starring Ernie Lotinga, Molly Lamont and Charles Hickman.

Plot summary
Two seaside photographers become entangled with a blackmailer.

Cast
 Ernie Lotinga as Jimmy Josser
 Molly Lamont as Julia Kaye
 Charles Hickman as Eddie Kaye
 Reginald Gardiner as Donald
 Wallace Lupino as Uncle Abel
 Joan Wyndham as Little Lady
 Arty Ash as Hank

References

Bibliography
 Sutton, David R. A chorus of raspberries: British film comedy 1929-1939. University of Exeter Press, 2000.

External links

1932 films
1932 comedy films
British comedy films
Films shot at Welwyn Studios
Films directed by Norman Lee
British black-and-white films
1930s English-language films
1930s British films